"Two of a Kind, Workin' on a Full House" is a song co-written by Warren Haynes, Dennis Robbins and Bobby Boyd. It was originally recorded by Robbins himself in 1987 for MCA Records and charted at number 71 on the Billboard country charts. The B-side to Robbins' version was "The Church on Cumberland Road," which was later a number one hit in 1989 for Shenandoah.

The song was later recorded by American country music artist Garth Brooks for his album No Fences in 1990. His rendition was released as the album's third single and his fifth consecutive number one hit.

Content
The song is a moderate up-tempo with a fiddle intro. Its lyrics describe the relationship between the narrator and his wife, whom he considers a perfect complement. The title is a double entendre, using poker hands to describe how well the couple complements each other, and that they plan to have children.

In his book Redneck Liberation: Country Music as Theology, author David Fillingim cited "Two of a Kind, Workin' on a Full House" as an "upbeat honky-tonk romp" that showed his "more traditional country music styles".

Background and Production

Garth Brooks Version
Garth provided the following background information on the song in the CD booklet liner notes from The Hits:

This song came to me through Jon Northrup.  He was doing a demo deal, and "Two of a Kind" was one of the four songs he was pitching for a demo.  When I heard it, I said, "I wish you all the luck on your deal, but if for some reason it falls through, I'd love to have this."  He called me three months later and told me I could have it if I wanted it.  I immediately cut it.  And to this day, even though it's a small, light-hearted song, it's one of the strongest parts of our live show.  People just seem to connect with this song.  This is a big point to writers and artists out there, especially myself, that sometimes intense gets the point across, but don't forget to show 'em your sense of humor.

Dennis Robbins Version
Dennis Robbins provided some background information about the song while on an interview on "The Paul Leslie Hour":

I did Two of a Kind, Workin’ on a Full House on MCA. It charted, it got to around 62 on the chart and that dropped off. And I got a call one night from this guy and he said: “You don’t know me but my name is Garth Brooks. And I just got a record deal on Capitol Records and I heard a song that’s the best song I’ve heard since I’ve been in Nashville called “Two of a Kind, Workin’ on a Full House”. And I was wondering if you’d put it on hold for me.” And I said: “Well, I’ll tell you what, you know I gave that song to Shenandoah, they just a number one, we had a number on hit with “The Church on Cumberland Road” and they called me for some more songs and that was one of the songs that I gave Marty Raybon with Shenandoah.” And so I said: “I tell you what, they should have let me know something by now and if you call me back tomorrow night about this time, I’ll find out tomorrow and I’ll have an answer for you tomorrow night if they’re gonna use that song or not.” And so I called Marty the next day and I asked him: “Hey, what’s up with the song? I mean are you guys thinking you’re gonna do it”? And he said: “Well Dennis we talked to our producer and we made a deal and an agreement with him that we weren’t gonna, you know we would have to listen to him when it came to picking the songs to record and he told us when he heard that song: “We’re not doing any Hank Williams sounding songs.” So I’m sorry, but we’re gonna have to pass on that.” And I said: “Okay man, well that’s fine.” And of course later on that night I got a callback from Garth and he asked me: “What did you found out about the song”? And I said: “Yeah, you got it and I won’t pitch it to anybody and I hope you have better luck with it than I did.” And he did that song pretty much, you can listen if you ever heard my version of it, he did it pretty much like the way I did it. So I was really impressed with it. I love his version of it, it was awesome.

Chart positions

Dennis Robbins Version

Garth Brooks Version

Year-end charts

References

1987 singles
1991 singles
1987 songs
Dennis Robbins songs
Garth Brooks songs
Songs written by Dennis Robbins
Song recordings produced by Allen Reynolds
MCA Records singles
Capitol Records Nashville singles
Songs written by Bobby Boyd (songwriter)